Mars Zakirovich Rafikov (29 September 1933 – 23 July 2000) was a Soviet cosmonaut who was dismissed from the Soviet space program for disciplinary reasons.

Career 
Senior Lieutenant Rafikov, age 26, was selected as one of the original 20 cosmonauts on 7 March 1960 along with Yuri Gagarin.

On 24 March 1962, Rafikov was dismissed from the cosmonaut corps, officially for "a variety of offenses, including womanizing and 'gallivanting' in Moscow restaurants, and so forth".  Other cosmonauts (notably Gagarin) had exhibited similar behavior, but could not be officially disciplined because of their stature and international reputation. Gherman Titov later suggested that the real reason for his dismissal was because he and his wife had divorced.

He remained in the military, serving as a pilot in the Soviet–Afghan War.

To protect the image of the space program, efforts were made to cover up the reason for Rafikov's dismissal. His image, like that of others who were dismissed, was airbrushed out of cosmonaut photos. This airbrushing led to speculation about "lost cosmonauts" even though the actual reasons were often mundane.

References

External links
 Details of the Soviet training program and launch
 Biographical details
 Titov recounts about disappearing cosmonauts
 Straight Dope entry about lost cosmonauts

1933 births
2000 deaths
Soviet cosmonauts
Soviet Air Force officers
Soviet military personnel of the Soviet–Afghan War
Syzran Higher Military Aviation School alumni